The Diageo Staff Association was a small trade union in the United Kingdom.

The union was founded in 1965 as a staff committee at the Guinness brewery in Park Royal, London.  Originally named the Guinness Brewing Staff Association, it gained a Certificate of Independence in 1979, when it had only 136 members.  It was renamed the Guinness UDV Staff Association in 1998, when it also affiliated to the Trades Union Congress (TUC).  In 2003, it adopted its final name, by which point it had 531 members.  By 2009, its membership had fallen below 400, and it was the smallest union affiliated to the TUC.

The union was dissolved early in 2010.

References

Defunct trade unions of the United Kingdom
Diageo
Trade unions established in 1965
Trade unions disestablished in 2010
1965 establishments in the United Kingdom
Food processing trade unions
Trade unions based in London